Mexican Colony ( or simply Colonia Mexicana) is a census-designated place in Kern County, California. The population was 283 at the 2020 census.

Demographics

At the 2010 census Mexican Colony had a population of 281. The racial makeup of Mexican Colony was 162 (57.7%) White, 0 (0.0%) African American, 15 (5.3%) Native American, 0 (0.0%) Asian, 0 (0.0%) Pacific Islander, 93 (33.1%) from other races, and 11 (3.9%) from two or more races. Hispanic or Latino of any race were 227 people (80.8%).

The whole population lived in households, no one lived in non-institutionalized group quarters and no one was institutionalized.

There were 71 households, 45 (63.4%) had children under the age of 18 living in them, 32 (45.1%) were opposite-sex married couples living together, 21 (29.6%) had a female householder with no husband present, 7 (9.9%) had a male householder with no wife present.  There were 9 (12.7%) unmarried opposite-sex partnerships, and 0 (0%) same-sex married couples or partnerships. 10 households (14.1%) were one person and 7 (9.9%) had someone living alone who was 65 or older. The average household size was 3.96.  There were 60 families (84.5% of households); the average family size was 4.25.

The age distribution was 115 people (40.9%) under the age of 18, 30 people (10.7%) aged 18 to 24, 70 people (24.9%) aged 25 to 44, 46 people (16.4%) aged 45 to 64, and 20 people (7.1%) who were 65 or older.  The median age was 24.3 years. For every 100 females, there were 105.1 males.  For every 100 females age 18 and over, there were 102.4 males.

There were 78 housing units at an average density of 2,454.3 per square mile, of the occupied units 31 (43.7%) were owner-occupied and 40 (56.3%) were rented. The homeowner vacancy rate was 3.1%; the rental vacancy rate was 2.4%.  119 people (42.3% of the population) lived in owner-occupied housing units and 162 people (57.7%) lived in rental housing units.

References

Census-designated places in Kern County, California
Mexican-American culture in California
Census-designated places in California